In human anatomy, the median umbilical ligament is an unpaired midline ligamentous structure upon the lower inner surface of the anterior abdominal wall. It is covered by the median umbilical fold.

The median umbilical ligament represents the remnant of the fetal urachus. It extends from the apex of the bladder to the umbilicus, on the deep surface of the anterior abdominal wall.

The median umbilical ligament represents one of the five ligaments of the internal anterior abdominal wall inferior to the umbilicus; laterally on either side of it are one medial umbilical ligament and finally one lateral umbilical ligament.

Development 
The median umbilical ligament begins as the allantois in the embryonic period. It then becomes the urachus in the fetus. This later develops into the median umbilical ligament at birth. It is also formed from the cloaca in utero.

Function 
The median umbilical ligament has no known function.

Clinical significance
The median umbilical ligament may be used as a landmark for surgeons who are performing laparoscopy, such as laparoscopic inguinal hernia repair. Other than this, it has no function in a born human and may be cut or removed with impunity.

It contains the urachus, which is the obliterated form of the allantois. The allantois forms a communication between the cloaca (terminal part of hindgut) and the amniotic sac during embryonic development. If the urachus fails to close during fetal life, it can result in anatomical abnormalities such as a urachal cyst, urachal fistula, urachal diverticulum or urachal sinus.

Society and culture 
The median umbilical ligament was jokingly referred to as "Xander's ligament" in a YouTube video published by Alexander R. Toftness (aka. ARTexplains on YouTube), and this name was subsequently used on Wikipedia for a short time. This term was later used in a paper published in Mayo Clinic Proceedings. The term has also appeared in a medical textbook of obstetrics and gynaecology.

References

External links 
 Median umbilical ligament
  - "The inguinal canal and derivation of the layers of the spermatic cord."
  - "The Male Pelvis: The Urinary Bladder"
 
 Median umbilical fold
  - "Internal surface of the anterior abdominal wall."

Abdomen
Ligaments